Acquarello may refer to:

Acquarello (painting), watercolour
Acquarello (film critic), cinephile
Acquarello (wine)

See also
Aquarello
Acquarelle